Henry John Wale (1827 – 14 March 1892 in London) was an English author, soldier and church minister.  He came from Little Shelford near Cambridge and was the son of General Sir Charles Wale. He served in the Crimea.

He was the tenth and youngest son of Major General Sir Charles Wale and his third wife Henrietta Brunt.  He went to school in Bury St Edmunds, and was admitted to Magdalene College, Cambridge, Cambridgeshire, England, on 9 December 1857, where he gained a B.A. in 1861 and an M.A. in 1864.

He was a Lieutenant in the 15th Hussars 1845-51; Scots Grays, 1854-7; served in the Crimea. Ord. deacon (Salisbury) 1861; priest, 1862; C. of Holy Trinity, Weymouth, 1861-3. C. of Ringwood, Hants., 1863-5. R. of Folksworth, Hunts., 1865-78. Organising Secretary, S.P.G., dio. of Rochester, 1881-92. Married Caroline, dau. of Edward Prest, of York, and had issue.

Publications

Sword and Surplice; or, Thirty Years' Reminiscences of the Army and the Church. An Autobiography Published by David Bogue, London 1880

References

English autobiographers
English biographers
19th-century English Anglican priests
1827 births
1892 deaths
Burials at Highgate Cemetery
15th The King's Hussars officers
Royal Scots Greys officers
English male non-fiction writers
People from Little Shelford